When They Lay Bare (1999) is the third novel by Scottish writer Andrew Greig.

Plot summary

A mysterious young woman moves into deserted Crawhill cottage on the estate of Sir Simon Elliot in the Scottish Borders. He fears she is the daughter of his mistress: "If it wasn't the child, Sim wondered, who was she and what the hell was she doing moving into Crawhill? And if it was her, what had she came back for, why had she not come to see him? Instead she had taken up residence in the cottage and waited. What did the lassie want with Davy?"

The novel is based around a set of antique plates that the young woman brings with her, depicting the Border Ballads, "Twa Corbies" and "Barbara Allen".

References

External links 

 Andrew Greig's website
 On GoodReads

1999 British novels
Novels by Andrew Greig
Scottish novels
Novels set in the Scottish Borders
Faber and Faber books